George Downing (1584–c.1659) was a pioneer English settler in County Londonderry during its plantation by the Livery Companies of the City of London. He was Sheriff of Derry during the 1620s and a member of the Parliament of Ireland in 1634.

Background and arrival in Ireland
George Downing is generally recognised as a scion of the Downing family of West Lexham, Norfolk, and the support he received in his later years from Philip Skippon points to his being the same George Downing, born in 1584, who was uncle both to Skippon and to Calybute Downing, the subversive Vicar of Hackney.

It was at Hackney that George Downing married Jane, one of the daughters of Edmund Rookwood of Weston Longville, Norfolk, in 1611. Her sister subsequently married James Higgons, a grocer on Old London Bridge, who engaged Downing to act as his agent at the outset of the Londonderry plantation. When, in February 1617, Higgons reached agreement in principle to take a lease of that part of the plantation allocated to the London Fishmongers' Company, Downing entered into occupation of the 3,210-acre property. In March 1619 he took formal delivery of it for Higgons following sealing of the lease, having himself been granted a superior freehold interest in part of the estate immediately beforehand.

Sheriff of Derry and MP for Limavady
Although resident at the “castle” of Ballykelly, in the heart of the Fishmongers’ proportion, Downing quickly obtained influence in the newly-built city of Derry. He was elected one of its two Sheriffs in 1624 and 1626 and, following his first wife’s death, he married a daughter of Bishop George Downham. The bishop was a member of the 1628 Royal Commission that investigated the London Companies’ conduct of the plantation, and the Commission’s criticisms, as endorsed and enlarged by Sir Thomas Phillips, were supported by a petition to which Downing was a signatory.

Sir Thomas Phillips controlled the borough of Newtown Limavady, three miles east of Ballykelly, and in 1634 Downing was elected by the borough to the Irish Parliament which sat at Dublin in July–August and November–December that year. In 1640 he was succeeded as Limavady’s MP by Sir Thomas’s son, Dudley Phillips, for whom he had acted when the confiscated estates of the London Companies were relet by the Crown.

Military service
From the outbreak of the Irish Rebellion of 1641 he served as an officer in the Company of Foot which Alderman Henry Finch raised in furtherance of a commission issued by the Lords Justices in Dublin and which became part of the garrison of Derry, and he was among the officers who signed a testimonial in support of Sir Audley Mervyn, the city’s Governor, on 1 March 1645.

Customs appointment
In March 1648 he was by order of both Houses of the English Parliament appointed Comptroller of Customs of the Port of Londonderry. The appointment was for life, was one of profit, and extended to the lesser ports of the plantation. Its value, although currently diminished by the Royalist Sir Robert Stewart’s use of artillery at Culmore to prevent sea access to the Parliamentary stronghold of Derry, suggests influence had been deployed in Downing’s favour within London political circles.

The possibility that Philip Skippon was the influencer is supported by the circumstance that, within a month of the Customs award, Skippon appeared personally before the Court of the Fishmongers’ Company to request Downing be allowed quiet enjoyment of lands held by sublease on the Company’s Londonderry estate.

Downing’s Customs appointment was short-lived. In October 1648 Sir Charles Coote, commanding the garrison in Derry, took Robert Stewart prisoner and on 8 January 1649 a grateful Parliament resolved that Coote was “to hold and enjoy the Fort of Culmore and the Customs of Londonderry, rendering an account of Profits to the Use of the State”. Such enjoyment also proved transitory: in April, Royalist forces began a four-month siege of Derry and Culmore, subjecting the inhabitants to “the greatest extremities” – of which Henry Finch’s letters are the principal surviving account.

Last years
The Letters Patent by which Cromwell granted Derry a new charter of incorporation on 24 March 1657 named Downing first when listing the twenty-four chief burgesses of the city, but his involvement in Derry’s civic affairs in the 1650s is not otherwise evidenced in extant records. The Civil Survey of 1654 named him as co-lessee with his son-in-law of a minor portion of the Fishmongers’ estate, and in 1658 the Fishmongers heard a further application for him to be free from disturbance on his land there. On the latter occasion the application was presented by “Major Cruso”, probably John Cruso the military tactician and long-standing friend of Philip Skippon.

Death and family
Downing died at some point between his attending a meeting of the burgesses constituting the Corporation of Limavady, on 24 June 1659, and the election of his successor as a burgess on 26 June 1660.

In 1664 his widow travelled to the Fishmongers’ Court in London to protest her poverty and her apprehension arising from the Company’s lease of its Irish estate to Sir Randal Beresford. She was Downing’s third wife. There is no evidence he had any child who survived to maturity other than a daughter, Mary, who married James Higgons junior (son of the Fishmongers’ first lessee at Ballykelly) and, after his death in 1642, Capt. Nicholas Lane (son of the cartographer Nicholas Lane).

Notes

References

1584 births
1659 deaths
Irish MPs 1634–1635
High Sheriffs of Londonderry City
Kingdom of England people in the Kingdom of Ireland